William Gates Computer Science Building may refer to:

 William Gates Computer Science Building (Stanford)
 William Gates Computer Science Building (Cambridge)

See also
 William Gates Building (disambiguation)